Ibraima So (born 30 November 1987) is a Bissau-Guinean footballer who plays for S.C.U. Torreense.

References

External links

1987 births
Living people
Sportspeople from Bissau
Bissau-Guinean footballers
Bissau-Guinean expatriate footballers
Association football midfielders
Segunda Divisão players
Associação Naval 1º de Maio players
Varzim S.C. players
Liga Portugal 2 players
Académico de Viseu F.C. players
F.C. Famalicão players
AD Fafe players
F.C. Alverca players
S.C.U. Torreense players
Guinea-Bissau international footballers
Bissau-Guinean expatriate sportspeople in Portugal
Expatriate footballers in Portugal